is a Japanese anime television series produced by Nippon Animation, based on Little Lulu comic by US cartoonist Marjorie Henderson Buell (Marge). The series was animated and directed by Fumio Kurokawa.

Plot
The series follows the everyday adventures of Little Lulu, Tubby, and the rest of their friends. The most prominent themes derived from the comics include the boys vs. girls rivalry, Tubby's clubhouse, and mishaps with the troublemaking Westside Gang.

Cast
 Lulu: Eiko Masuyama (episodes 1-3), Minori Matsushima (episodes 4-26)
 Tubby: Keiko Yamamoto
 Wilbur: Noriko Ohara
 Iggy: Yoneko Matsukane
 Annie: Junko Hori
 Alvin: Sachiko Chijimatsu
 Martha: Noriko Ohara
 George: Masayuki Katō
 Putchy: Hiroshi Masuoka
 Floory: Mahito Tsujimura
 Willie: Yuko Mita

International broadcasting
The TV series was produced by Nippon Animation, and aired on ABC and NET from October 3, 1976 to April 3, 1977 in Japan, their opening theme homonymous and ending theme "I'm Lulu!", were written by Miko Kayama, composed by Nobuyoshi Koshibe, and performed by Mitsuko Horie. The TV series later was also dubbed in Italian, German, Hebrew, Arabic, Spanish, and Brazilian Portuguese.

English versions 
An English dub of the anime was made by ZIV International in 1978, and Mark Mercury composed the opening score, while the opening and credits sequence consisted of scenes taken from episodes. The on-screen English title for the series was simply Little Lulu, while its VHS releases were titled The Adventures of Little Lulu and Tubby in the United States, and The Adventures of Little Lulu in the UK. 

In 1985, Harmony Gold produced another English dub, changing the voice cast, the opening sequence was kept and the ending sequence was changed; however, the Mercury composition was intact.

Italian versions 
Two dubs were produced in Italy, the first was in 1981, This Dub is currently lost. In this same year, Heritage Cinematografica produced a film for Italian cinemas that used several of the episodes of the television program, in addition to replacing the music of Mercury, the opening and ending theme was changed to one composed of Cesare Regazzoni and Massimo Chiodi. In 2010 EMI Film released the movie on DVD, the second was done by SD Cinematografica in 1995, using the Mercury soundtrack.

Spanish versions 

In 1972, the Chilean musician Juan Guillermo Aguirre known as Memo Aguirre emigrated to United States, settling in San Francisco and dedicating himself to being a singer in bars and discos. Later he was given a job at the Sound Connections Studios company and dedicated himself to the interpretation of musical themes in Spanish from various cartoons from the 70s and 80s, being credited as "Superbanda" (Superband). These included Little Lulu and her little friends, replacing the Mercury theme.

Episodes

References

External links
 
 
 

Little Lulu
Japanese children's animated comedy television series
Nippon Animation
Television shows based on comic strips
Animated television series about children